The 1944 Kentucky Derby was the 70th running of the Kentucky Derby. The race took place on May 6, 1944.

Full results

 Winning breeder: Calumet Farm (KY)

References

1944
Kentucky Derby
Derby
May 1944 sports events